
Gmina Dębe Wielkie is a rural gmina (administrative district) in Mińsk County, Masovian Voivodeship, in east-central Poland.

Villages
Gmina Dębe Wielkie contains the villages and settlements of Aleksandrówka, Bykowizna, Celinów, Cezarów, Choszczak, Choszczówka Dębska, Choszczówka Rudzka, Choszczówka Stojecka, Chrośla, Cięciwa, Cyganka, Dębe Wielkie, Górki, Gorzanka, Jędrzejnik, Kąty Goździejewskie Drugie, Kąty Goździejewskie Pierwsze, Kobierne, Łaszczyzna, Olesin, Ostrów-Kania, Poręby, Ruda, Rysie, Teresław and Walercin.

Neighbouring gminas
Gmina Dębe Wielkie is bordered by the town of Zielonka and by the gminas of Halinów, Mińsk Mazowiecki, Stanisławów and Wiązowna.

References 

Debe Wielkie
Mińsk County